Pithecopus rusticus is a species of frog in the family Hylidae, endemic to Brazil.

This frog lives in grasslands within Brazil's Atlantic forests.

References

Amphibians described in 2014
Endemic fauna of Brazil
Frogs of South America
rusticus